Chad Letts (born 20 December 2000) is a professional footballer. Born in the United States, Letts has represented Jamaica at youth international level.

Club career

Youth 
Letts spent time in the Philadelphia Union and Atlanta United youth academies.

Senior 

In 2018, Letts signed with Union SG in Belgium.

International career 

Letts has featured for the Jamaica U17 national team in 2016.

Career statistics

Club

Notes

References

2000 births
Living people
Jamaican footballers
Jamaican expatriate footballers
Association football forwards
Royale Union Saint-Gilloise players
Challenger Pro League players
Jamaican expatriate sportspeople in the United States
Expatriate soccer players in the United States
Jamaican expatriate sportspeople in Belgium
Expatriate footballers in Belgium
Soccer players from Atlanta
Jamaica youth international footballers